Johannes Kaempf (February 18, 1842 in Neuruppin – May 25, 1918 in Berlin) was a German liberal politician and banker. From 1912 to 1918 he was president of the Reichstag.

Life
Johannes Kaempf was the director of the branch of the Bank of Trade and Industry in Berlin and President of the German trading day. As President of the Economic Society, he joined in 1903 for the establishment of a Graduate School of Berlin. He was a member of the Free-minded People's Party and the Progressive People's Party and represented the left-wing liberals for the first Berlin Constituency from 1903 to 1918 in the Reichstag. From 1912 until his death he was president of the German Reichstag.

Kaempf's death in May 1918 had an unexpected side effect on the fate of the Empire. Because of the need to occupy Kaempf's Reichstag mandate constituency anew, the Independent Social Democratic Party of Germany (USPD) could nominate the left trade unionists and revolutionary Richard Müller for the by-election; the government had to exempt these from military service. Müller was released in September 1918 from the army and came to Berlin, lost the election, but played a significant role in the organization of the insurrection of 9 November.

On 22 October 1899 Kaempf was awarded the honorary title of city elder of Berlin. In 1915 he was awarded an honorary title of Kaiser Wilhelm II. This was the decision for the inscription "To the German People" at the Reichstag building in Berlin.

Kaempf was a member of the Masonic Lodge of Saint John the Black Eagle in Landsberg on the Warta River and honorary member of the Grand National-Muttlerloge, The Three Globes. He was buried in Südwestkirchhof Stahnsdorf.

Literature
John Kaempf: speeches and essays. Published by the elders of the merchants of Berlin. Berlin, Georg Reimer, 1912
Wolfgang Wölk: Kaempf, Johannes. In: New German Biography (NDB). Volume 10, Duncker & Humblot, Berlin 1974, page 728 f. (Digitized).

Links
Johannes Kaempf in the database of members of the Reichstag
Biography of Johannes Kaempf. In: Henry Best: Database of deputies of the Diet of the Empire 1867/71 to 1918 (Biorab - Empire)

References
Ralf Hoff Rogge: Richard Muller - The Man Behind the November revolution. Berlin 2008, p 60ff.

External links

1842 births
1918 deaths
People from Neuruppin
People from the Province of Brandenburg
Free-minded People's Party (Germany) politicians
Progressive People's Party (Germany) politicians
Members of the 11th Reichstag of the German Empire
Members of the 12th Reichstag of the German Empire
Members of the 13th Reichstag of the German Empire
German Freemasons
German bankers